Tsemo Castle (also known as Namgyal Tsemo or Leh Fort complex) is an important religious and historical point in Leh, Ladakh, India. It is located at a walking distance from the Leh Palace. The defensive structure is maintained by Archaeological Survey of India. It is located at the highest point in Leh.

History 
The castle is believed to have been built during the time of Tashi Namgyal (1555-1575).

References 

Buildings and structures in Ladakh